Compsosaris is a genus of moths in the family Gelechiidae.

Species
 Compsosaris flavidella (Busck, 1914)
 Compsosaris testacea Meyrick, 1914

References

Gelechiinae
Taxa named by Edward Meyrick
Moth genera